Daisy Campbell was a British film actress of the silent era. At the beginning of her career was popular on the London stage.  Noted for playing aristocratic white-haired ladies and duchesses.  Appeared in more than 20 British silent films.  Made her film debut portraying 'Mrs. Waltham' in Denison Clift's "Demos" with Milton Rosmer, 1921.  Best remembered as 'Countess of Strangeway s' in Arthur Maude's "Poppies of Flanders," 1927. Her final appear was portraying 'Mrs. McPhillip' in "The Informer," 1929, written by Arthur Robison and starring Lya De Putti and Lars Hanson.

Selected filmography
 Demos (1921)
 The Nonentity (1921)
 A Woman of No Importance (1921)
 Expiation (1922)
 The Indian Love Lyrics (1923)
 The White Shadow (1923)
 Out to Win (1923)
 Hurricane Hutch in Many Adventures (1924)
 The Wonderful Wooing (1925)
 The Woman Who Did (1925)
 Irish Destiny (1926)
 London (1926)
 Poppies of Flanders (1927)
 Second to None (1927)
 A Daughter in Revolt (1928)
 High Seas (1929)
 The Informer (1929)
 After the Verdict (1929)

References

External links

Year of birth unknown
Year of death unknown
English film actresses
English silent film actresses
20th-century English actresses